The Gulf Coast Showcase is a college basketball tournament that started in 2013 held at Hertz Arena in Estero, Florida. The men’s eight-team tournament, was designed to showcase the top mid-major programs from across the country. The women's tournament is held the week after the men's tournament, and showcases a mix of mid-major and top major programs. Until 2017 All games were streamed on ASunTV] until 2017. Flohoops.com received streaming rights on subscription service since the 2017 season.

Brackets 
* – Denotes overtime period

2022

Men's

Women's

2021

Men's

Women's

2020

Men's 
No Tournament due to Covid-19

Women's 

Games were played at Alico Arena on the campus of Florida Gulf Coast University, in Fort Myers, Florida

2019

Men's

Women's

2018

Men's

Women's

2017

Men's

Women's

2016

Men's

Women's

2015

Men's

Women's

2014

Men's

Women's

2013

Men's

Women's

External links
 Gulf Coast Showcase

College men's basketball competitions in the United States
College basketball competitions
College women's basketball competitions in the United States
2013 establishments in Florida
Basketball competitions in Florida